Leeuwenhoekiella aestuarii  is a Gram-negative, aerobic and rod-shaped bacterium from the genus of Leeuwenhoekiella.

References 

Flavobacteria
Bacteria described in 2020
Leeuwenhoekiella